The 2020 NBL Finals was the championship series of the 2019–20 NBL season and the conclusion of the season. The semi-finals started on 28 February and finished on 5 March 2020, with the following Grand Final starting on 8 March and being cancelled on 15 March 2020.

The Grand Final series was due to finish by 22 March 2020, however the COVID-19 pandemic forced the series to finish on 15 March 2020. The Perth Wildcats were leading 2–1 over the Sydney Kings in the best-of-five series when the remaining games were cancelled, which led the NBL to award Perth the title.

Format 
The finals was played in February and March 2020 between the top four teams of the regular season, consisting of two best-of-three semi-final and one best-of-five final series, where the higher seed hosts the first, third and fifth games.

Impact of the COVID-19 pandemic 
Prior to Game 2 of the Grand Final, the NBL announced that the remainder of the Grand Final series would be played behind closed doors due to the COVID-19 pandemic, with only players, essential personnel and friends and family would be permitted to attend the remaining games. In the event of a player being diagnosed with COVID-19, the Grand Final series would be immediately suspended.

Following Game 3, the Sydney Kings informed the NBL that they did not wish to proceed with the remaining two games. Subsequently, the NBL decided to cancel Games 4 and 5. With the Perth Wildcats leading the series 2–1, the NBL announced that the Wildcats were declared the champions.

Qualification

Qualified teams

Ladder

Seedings 

 Sydney Kings
 Perth Wildcats
 Cairns Taipans
 Melbourne United

The NBL tie-breaker system as outlined in the NBL Rules and Regulations states that in the case of an identical win–loss record, the overall points percentage will determine order of seeding.

Playoff Bracket

Semi-finals series

(2) Perth Wildcats vs. (3) Cairns Taipans

Regular season series

Cairns won 2–1 in the regular season series:

(1) Sydney Kings vs. (4) Melbourne United

Regular season series 

Sydney won 3–1 in the regular season series:

Grand Final series

(1) Sydney Kings vs. (2) Perth Wildcats

Games 4 and 5 were cancelled and the Perth Wildcats declared champions after the Sydney Kings indicated they did not wish to proceed due to the COVID-19 pandemic.

See also 

 2019–20 NBL season

References 

2020
 Finals
NBL Finals,2020